This is a list of compositions for piano and orchestra. For a description of related musical forms, see Concerto and Piano concerto.

Piano concertos and works in concertante form

A 

Johann Christian Ludwig Abeille
Grand Concerto in D major, Op. 6 (1763), for one piano four-hands and orchestra
Carl Friedrich Abel
 6 Concertos for harpsichord (or pianoforte), two violins and cello, Op. 11 (first printed in 1771; F, B-flat, E-flat, D, G, C)
Anton García Abril
Piano Concerto
Jean Absil
Concerto for Piano and Orchestra No. 1, Op. 30 (1938)
Concerto for Piano and Orchestra No. 2, Op. 131 (1967)
Concerto for Piano and Orchestra No. 3, Op. 162 (1973)
John Adams
Grand Pianola Music (1982)
Eros Piano (1989)
Century Rolls for piano and orchestra (1997)
Must the Devil Have All the Good Tunes? (2018)
Richard Addinsell
Warsaw Concerto (1941)
Thomas Adès
Concerto conciso, Op. 18
In Seven Days, Op. 25 (2008)
Concerto for Piano and Orchestra, Op. 32 (2018)
Isaac Albéniz
Rapsodia española, Op. 70 (1887)
Concierto fantástico in A minor, Op. 78 (1887)
Eugen d'Albert
Piano Concerto No. 1 in B minor, Op. 2 (1883-4)
Piano Concerto No. 2 in E, Op. 12 (1892)
Frangis Ali-Sade
Piano Concerto (1972)
Charles-Valentin Alkan
Concerto da Camera No. 1 in A minor, Op. 10, No. 1 (1828)
Concerto da Camera No. 2 in C-sharp minor, Op. 10, No. 2 (1828)
Concerto da Camera No. 3 in C-sharp minor (reconstructed H. Macdonald)
Piano Concerto Op. 39 (orch. Klindworth)
Peter Allen
"Hurricane Juan" Piano Concerto (2008)
Eyvind Alnæs
Piano Concerto in D major, Op. 27
Anton Arensky
Piano Concerto in F minor, Op. 2 (1883)
Fantasia on Russian Folksongs, Op. 48
 Thomas Arne
 6 Favourite Concertos for harpsichord, piano, or organ (late 18th century)
Malcolm Arnold
Concerto for Piano Duet and Strings, Op. 32 (1951)
Concerto for Phyllis and Cyril, Op. 104 (1969), for 3 hands at 2 pianos (one pianist plays with both hands, the other with only one hand)
Fantasy on a Theme of John Field, Op. 116
Alexander Arutiunian
Piano Concertino (1951)
Daniel Asia
Concerto for Piano and Orchestra (1994)
Kurt Atterberg
Piano Concerto in B-flat minor, Op. 37 (1927–35)
Lera Auerbach
 Piano Concerto No. 1, Op. 39 (1997–98) (I. River of Loss; 2. Dialogue with Time; 3. Wind of Oblivion; Part 2, Dialogue with Time, can be performed separately as an orchestral piece with the piano being part of the orchestra)
 Double concerto for violin, piano and orchestra, Op. 40 (1997)

B 
Kees van Baaren
Concertino for Piano and Orchestra (1934)
Arno Babajanian
Concerto for Piano and Orchestra (1944)
"Heroic Ballade" for Piano and Orchestra (1950)
Milton Babbitt
Piano Concerto (1985)
Piano Concerto No. 2 (1998)
 Carl Philipp Emanuel Bach
 About 50 keyboard concertos, including one for harpsichord and fortepiano.
 Johann Christian Bach
 6 Concertos for Harpsichord, Op. 1
 5 Concertos for Harpsichord; Concerto for Harpsichord in F minor
 6 Concertos for Keyboard, Op. 7
 6 Concertos for Keyboard, Op. 13
 Johann Sebastian Bach (all 1720s-1740s)
 Harpsichord concertos:
 BWV 1052 for harpsichord and strings in D minor, presumed to have been transcribed from a lost violin concerto previously written by the composer himself, used again in the Sinfonia and opening chorus of cantata Wir müssen durch viel Trübsal, BWV 146 and the Sinfonia of cantata BWV 188
 BWV 1053 for harpsichord and strings in E major, probably after a lost oboe concerto
 BWV 1054 for harpsichord and strings in D major, after his violin concerto in E major, BWV 1042
 BWV 1055 for harpsichord and strings in A major, after a lost oboe d'amore concerto
 BWV 1056 for harpsichord and strings in F minor, probably after a lost violin concerto
 BWV 1057 for harpsichord, 2 recorders and strings in F major, after Brandenburg concerto no.4 in G major, BWV 1049
 BWV 1058 for harpsichord and strings in G minor, after his violin concerto in A minor, BWV 1041
 BWV 1050 – Brandenburg concerto no.5 in D major, for harpsichord, flute, violin and strings
 BWV 1044 for harpsichord, violin, flute and strings in A minor, 1st and 3rd movements after his Prelude and Fugue in A minor for harpsichord, BWV 894 and second movement after the second movement from his trio sonata in D minor for organ, BWV 527
 BWV 1060 for 2 harpsichords and strings in C minor, after a lost violin and oboe concerto
 BWV 1061 for 2 harpsichords and strings in C major; the harpsichord parts alone are considered the original concerto 'BWV 1061a' with the string parts added later
 BWV 1062 for 2 harpsichords and strings in C minor, after his double violin concerto in D minor, BWV 1043
 BWV 1063 for 3 harpsichords and strings in D minor
 BWV 1064 for 3 harpsichords and strings in C major, after a lost triple violin concerto
 BWV 1065 for 4 harpsichords and strings in A minor, after Vivaldi's concerto for 4 violins in B minor, RV 580 (l'estro armonico op.3 no.10, RV580)
Leonardo Balada
Piano Concerto No. 1 (1964)
Piano Concerto No. 2, for piano, winds, and percussion (1974)
Piano Concerto No. 3 (1999)
Mily Balakirev
Piano Concerto No. 1 in F-sharp minor, Op. 1 (1855)
Grande Fantaisie on Russian Folk Songs, Op. 4 (1852)
Piano Concerto No. 2 in E-flat, Op. posth. (completed by Sergei Lyapunov, 1911)
Samuel Barber
Piano Concerto, Op. 38 (1962)
Henry Barraud
Piano Concerto (by 1947)
Béla Bartók
Piano Concerto No. 1 in A, Sz. 83 (1926)
Piano Concerto No. 2 in G, Sz. 95 (1930-1)
Piano Concerto No. 3 in E, Sz. 119 (1945)
Arnold Bax
Symphonic Variations (1918)
Winter Legends (1930)
 Piano Concertino (1939)
 Morning Song (1946)
 Concertante for Orchestra with Piano (Left Hand) (1949)
Amy Beach
Piano Concerto in C-sharp minor, Op. 45 (1899)
Ludwig van Beethoven
Piano Concerto in E-flat, WoO 4 (1784), written in adolescence
Piano Concerto No. 1 in C, Op. 15 (1798)
Piano Concerto No. 2 in B-flat, Op. 19 (1795)
Piano Concerto No. 3 in C minor, Op. 37 (1800)
Triple Concerto for piano, violin, cello and orchestra in C, Op. 56 (1804-5)
Piano Concerto No. 4 in G, Op. 58 (1805-6)
Piano Concerto in D, Op. 61a (1806), Beethoven's own arrangement of the Violin Concerto
Piano Concerto No. 5 in E-flat, Op. 73 (1809), the Emperor
Fantasy in C minor for Piano, Chorus, and Orchestra, Op. 80 (Choral Fantasy) (1808)
Victor Bendix
Piano Concerto in G minor, Op. 17 (1884)
Arthur Benjamin
Piano Concertino (1928)
Concerto Quasi una Fantasia (1949)
Richard Rodney Bennett
Piano Concerto (1968)
William Sterndale Bennett
Piano Concerto No. 1 in D minor, Op. 1
Piano Concerto No. 2 in E-flat, Op. 4
Piano Concerto No. 3 in C minor, Op. 9 (1833)
Piano Concerto No. 4 in F minor, Op. 19
Piano Concerto No. 5 in F minor
Piano Concerto No. 6 in A minor
Caprice in E, Op 22
Adagio
Peter Benoit
Piano Concerto, Op. 43b
Flint Juventino Beppe
Piano Concerto No. 1 «Anxiety», Op. 24 (1995)
Piano Concerto No. 2 «Urge», Op. 44 (1999)
Piano Concerto No. 3 «Monster», Op. 45 (1999)
Luciano Berio
Concerto for Two Pianos and Orchestra (1973)
Points on a Curve to Find – Piano Concerto (1973-4)
Lennox Berkeley
Piano Concerto in B-flat, Op. 29 (1947)
Concerto for Two Pianos and Orchestra, Op. 30 (1948)
Leonard Bernstein
Symphony No. 2 The Age of Anxiety (1948, rev. 1965), after W. H. Auden
Franz Berwald
Piano Concerto in D (1855)
Adolphe Biarent
Rapsodie Wallone (1910)
Boris Blacher
Piano Concerto No. 1 (1947)
Piano Concerto No. 2 (In variable metres) (1952)
Variations on a Theme of Muzio Clementi (1961)
Howard Blake
Piano Concerto
Arthur Bliss
Piano Concerto in B-flat (1939)
Ernest Bloch
Concerto symphonique in B minor (1947-8)
Scherzo fantastique (1948)
Felix Blumenfeld
Allegro de concert in A major, Op. 7 (1889)
Emil Bohnke
Concerto in D minor for piano and orchestra, Op. 14 (1925)
François-Adrien Boieldieu
Piano Concerto in F major
Sergei Bortkiewicz
Piano Concerto, Op. 1 (destroyed, material partly used in the Piano Concerto No. 2)
Piano Concerto No. 1 in B-flat, Op. 16 (1913)
Piano Concerto No. 2 in E-flat, Op. 28, for left hand alone, written for Paul Wittgenstein (1924)
Piano Concerto No. 3 in C minor, Per Aspera ad Astra, Op. 32 (1927)
Russian Rhapsody
Dmitry Bortniansky
Piano Concerto in C major
Henriëtte Bosmans
Concertino for Piano and Orchestra (1928)
York Bowen
Piano Concerto No. 1 in E-flat Op. 11 (1903)
Piano Concerto No. 2 in D minor ("Concertstück") Op. 17 (1905)
Piano Concerto No. 3 in G minor ("Fantaisie") Op. 23 (1907)
Piano Concerto No. 4 in A minor Op. 88 (1929)
Johannes Brahms
Piano Concerto No. 1 in D minor, Op. 15 (1859)
Piano Concerto No. 2 in B-flat, Op. 83 (1881)
Frank Bridge
Fantasm (1931)
Benjamin Britten
Piano Concerto in D, Op. 13 (1938, revised 1945)
Diversions on a Theme for Piano Left Hand and Orchestra, Op. 21 (1940), for Paul Wittgenstein
Scottish Ballad, Op. 26, for two pianos and orchestra (1941)
Hans Bronsart von Schellendorff
Piano Concerto in F-sharp minor, Op. 10
Stephen Brown
Piano Concerto, The Red Hot (1995–96)
Max Bruch
Concerto in A-flat minor for two pianos, Op. 88a
Ignaz Brüll
Piano Concerto No. 1 in F, Op. 10 (1860-1)
Piano Concerto No. 2 in C, Op. 24 (1868)
Rhapsodie in D minor, Op. 65 (1892)
Andante and Allegro, Op. 88
Fritz Brun
Piano Concerto in A (1946)
Norbert Burgmüller
Piano Concerto in F-sharp minor, Op. 1 (1829)
Alan Bush
Piano Concerto, Op. 18, with baritone and male choir in last movement (1938)
Ferruccio Busoni
Piano Concerto in D, Op. 17, for piano and string orchestra (1878)
Konzert-Fantasie, Op. 29 (1888-9)
Introduction and Allegro, Op. 31a (1890)
Konzert-Fantasie, Op. 32 (1888–89)
Piano Concerto in C, Op. 39 (1902-4), with male chorus
Indian Fantasy, Op. 44
Introduction et scherzo (1882-4)
Konzertstück in D, Op. 31a (1890)
Romanza e scherzoso, Op. 54 (1921), published together with Op. 31a as "Concertino"
Garrett Byrnes
Concerto for Piano and Chamber Orchestra (2003)
Nimrod Borenstein
Concerto for Piano and Orchestra, Op. 91 (2021)

C 

John Cage
Concerto for Prepared Piano and Orchestra (1951)
Concert for Piano and Orchestra (1957–58)
Fourteen, for bowed piano and thirteen players (1990)
Charles Camilleri
Piano Concerto No. 1, Mediterranean (1948)
Piano Concerto No. 2, Maqam (1968)
Piano Concerto No. 3, Leningrad (1984)
Joseph Canteloube
Pièces françaises (1934-5)
John Alden Carpenter
Concertino for Piano and Orchestra (1920)
Elliott Carter
Piano Concerto (1965)
Double Concerto for Harpsichord and Piano with Two Chamber Orchestras (1961)
Robert Casadesus
Concerto for two pianos
Alfredo Casella
Scarlattiana, divertimento on music of Domenico Scarlatti for piano and small orchestra, Op. 44 (1926)
Alexis de Castillon
Piano Concerto in D major, Op. 12
Cécile Chaminade
Konzertstück in C-sharp minor, Op. 40 (1896?, fp 1908)
Claude Champagne
Concerto for Piano and Orchestra (1948)
Carlos Chávez
Piano Concerto (1938–40, revised 1969)
Qigang Chen
Er Huang for Piano and Orchestra (2009)
Frédéric Chopin
Variations on "Là ci darem la mano" in B-flat major, Op. 2 (1827)
Piano Concerto No. 1 in E minor, Op. 11 (1830)
Fantasy on Polish Airs in A major, Op. 13 (1828)
Rondo à la Krakowiak in F major, Op. 14 (1828)
Piano Concerto No. 2 in F minor, Op. 21 (1829-1830)
Andante spianato et Grande Polonaise brillante in E-flat major, Op. 22
Muzio Clementi
Piano Concerto in C major (c. 1790)
Paul Constantinescu
Piano Concerto (1952)
Aaron Copland
Piano Concerto (1926)
John Corigliano
Piano Concerto (1968)
Henry Cowell
Piano Concerto (1929)
Carl Czerny
Piano Concerto in D minor
'Grand' Piano Concerto in E-flat major
Piano Concerto in F, Op. 28
Piano Concertino in C, Op. 78
Piano Concerto in C for four hands, Op. 153
Piano Concerto in A minor, Op. 214
Piano Concertino in C, Op. 210
3 unpublished concertos, mentioned in Mandyczewski

D 

Luigi Dallapiccola
Piano Concerto
Franz Danzi
Piano Concerto in E-flat major
Peter Maxwell Davies
Piano Concerto (1997)
Claude Debussy
Printemps, L. 61 (1887), symphonic suite for choir, piano, and orchestra
Fantaisie, L. 73 (1889–90)
Arthur De Greef
Piano Concerto No. 1 in C minor (1914)
Piano Concerto No. 2 in B-flat minor (1930)
Frederick Delius
Piano Concerto in C minor (1897–1906)
Peter Dickinson
Piano Concerto (1984)
Issay Dobrowen
Piano Concerto in C sharp minor, Op. 20 (1926)
Ernő Dohnányi
Piano Concerto No. 1 in E minor, Op. 5 (1897-8)
Variations on a Nursery Tune, Op. 25 (1914)
Piano Concerto No. 2 in B minor, Op. 42 (1946-7)
Felix Draeseke
Piano Concerto in E-flat, Op. 36 (1885-6)
Alexander Dreyschock
Morceau de Concert in C minor, Op. 27
Piano Concerto in D minor, Op. 137
Marcel Dupré
Fantasie, Op. 8 (1919?)
František Xaver Dušek
Piano concerto in D major
Piano Concerto in E-flat major
Jan Ladislav Dussek
Thirteen solo piano concertos including
Piano Concerto in B-flat major, Op. 22, Craw 97
Concerto for Two Pianos in B-flat major, Op. 63 No. 10
Antonín Dvořák
Piano Concerto in G minor, Op. 33 (1876)
George Dyson
Concerto Leggiero for Piano and String Orchestra

E 

Petr Eben
Piano Concerto (1960-1)
Dennis Eberhard
Piano Concerto 'Shadow of the Swan'
Sophie Carmen Eckhardt-Gramatté
Three piano concertos
Ross Edwards
Piano Concerto in A (1982)
Gottfried von Einem
Piano Concerto No. 1
Edward Elgar
Piano Concerto (incomplete, completed by Robert Walker) (begun 1913, sketches continue until 1934)
Keith Emerson
Piano Concerto No. 1 (1977)
Einar Englund
Piano Concerto No. 1 (1955)
Piano Concerto No. 2 (1974)
Eduard Erdmann
Piano Concerto (1928)
Iván Erőd
Piano Concerto op. 19 (1975)
Andrei Eshpai
Piano Concerto No. 1 (published 1957)
Piano Concerto No. 2

F 

 Manuel de Falla
Nights in the Gardens of Spain (Noches en los jardines de España, 1916)
Ernest Farrar
Variations for Piano and Orchestra, Op. 25
Gabriel Fauré
Ballade in F-sharp, Op. 19 (1881)
Fantaisie in G, Op. 111 (1919)
Samuil Feinberg
Piano Concerto No. 1 in C major, Op. 20 (1931)
Piano Concerto No. 2 in D major, Op. 36 (1945)
Piano Concerto No. 3 in C minor, Op. 44 (1947/51)
Morton Feldman
Piano and Orchestra (1975)
Howard Ferguson
Piano Concerto in D (1951)
Lorenzo Ferrero
Concerto for Piano and Orchestra (1991)
Concerto for Piano and Orchestra No. 2 (2007)
Richard Festinger
Concerto for Piano and Nine Instruments (2007)
John Field
Piano Concerto No. 1 in E-flat, H. 27 (1799)
Piano Concerto No. 2 in A-flat, H. 31 (1811)
Piano Concerto No. 3 in E-flat, H. 32 (1811)
Piano Concerto No. 4 in E-flat, H. 28 (1814, revised 1819)
Piano Concerto No. 5 in C, H. 39 (1817), l'Incedie par l'Orage
Piano Concerto No. 6 in C, H. 49 (1819, revised 1820)
Piano Concerto No. 7 in C minor, H. 58 (1822, revised 1822-32)
Fantaisie sur un air favorite de mon ami N.P. in A minor, H. 4A (1822), orchestral part now lost
Serenade in B-flat, H. 37
Grande pastorale in E, H. 54A (1832), orchestral part now lost
Gerald Finzi
Eclogue for Piano and Strings, Op. 10
Grand Fantasia and Toccata, Op. 38
Ben Folds
Piano Concerto
 Joseph Dillon Ford
 Concerto for Harpsichord (2006)
Lukas Foss
Piano Concerto No. 1 (1939–43)
Piano Concerto No. 2 (1951)
Jean Françaix
Concertino in G major (1932)
Concerto (1936)
César Franck
Variations brillantes sur la ronde favorite de Gustave III (Auber) (1834-5)
Piano Concerto No. 2 in B minor, Op. 11 (juvenilia, 1835)
Symphonic Variations, FWV 46 (1885)
Les Djinns, FWV 45 (1884), symphonic poem
Eduard Franck
Piano Concerto No. 1 in D minor, Op. 13 (1849)
Piano Concerto No. 2 in C major (1879)
Concerto for two pianos in C major (1852)
Richard Franck
Piano Concerto No. 1 in D minor (1880)
Piano Concerto No. 2 in A major (1881)
Piano concerto No. 3 in E minor, Op. 50 (1910)
Peter Fribbins
Piano Concerto (2010 - 2011)
Gunnar de Frumerie
Variations and Fugue for Piano and Orchestra (1932)
Robert Fuchs
Piano Concerto in B-flat minor, Op. 27 (1879–80)
Beat Furrer
Concerto (2007)
Wilhelm Furtwängler
Symphonic Piano Concerto in B minor (1936-7)

G 
Niels Wilhelm Gade
Symphony No.5 in D minor with solo piano, Op.25 (1852)
Kyle Gann
 Sunken City (Concerto for piano and winds) (2007)
Antonio García
... And Silence Again (concertino for piano and chamber orchestra) (2018) 
Roberto Gerhard
Piano Concerto (1951)
Concerto for Piano and Strings (1961)
 Concerto for harpsichord, percussion and strings (mid 20th century)
George Gershwin
Piano Concerto in F (1925)
Rhapsody in Blue (1924)
Second Rhapsody (1934)
Variations on "I Got Rhythm" (1934)
Alberto Ginastera
Piano Concerto No. 1, Op. 28 (1961)
Piano Concerto No. 2, Op. 39 (1972)
Peggy Glanville-Hicks
Etruscan Concerto
Philip Glass
Piano Concerto No. 1, Tirol (2000)
Piano Concerto No. 2, After Lewis and Clark (2004)
Concerto for Harpsichord and Chamber Orchestra (2002)
Piano Concerto No. 3 (2017)
Alexander Glazunov
Piano Concerto No. 1 in F minor, Op. 92 (1911)
Piano Concerto No. 2 in B, Op. 100
Benjamin Godard
Piano Concerto No. 1 in A minor, Op. 31 (1879)
Piano Concerto No. 2 in G minor, Op. 148 (1899)
Introduction and Allegro, Op. 49 (1880)
Roger Goeb
Concerto for Piano and Orchestra (1954)
Fantasy for Piano and String Orchestra (1955)
Alexander Goedicke
Piano Concerto, Op. 11 (1900)
Konzertstück in D, Op. 11 (1900)
Hermann Goetz
Piano Concerto in E-flat (1861)
Piano Concerto in B-flat, Op. 18 (1867)
Otar Gordeli
Piano Concerto in C minor (1951)
Piano Concerto in C minor, Op. 2 (1952)
Geoffrey Gordon
Saint Blue (Double concerto for piano, trumpet and string orchestra, after works by Kandinsky) (2014)
 Henryk Górecki
 Harpsichord Concerto (1980)
Louis Moreau Gottschalk
Grande Tarantelle, Op. 67 (1858–64)
Charles Gounod
Concerto for Piano pédalier and Orchestra in E-flat
Fantaisie sur l'hymne national russe for Piano pédalier and Orchestra (1886)
Suite Concertante for Piano pédalier and Orchestra in A (1890)
Paul Graener
Piano Concerto in A minor Op. 72
Enrique Granados
Suite de navidad (1914-5), arranged from opera La cieguecita de Betania
Edvard Grieg
Piano Concerto in A minor, Op. 16 (1868)
Ferde Grofé
Concerto for Piano and Orchestra in D (1958)
Heinz Karl Gruber
Piano Concerto (2014-2016)
Jorge Grundman
Concerto for Piano and String Orchestra. The Toughest Decision of God Op. 63 (2018)
Camargo Guarnieri
Piano Concerto No. 1
Piano Concerto No. 2
Piano Concerto No. 3
Piano Concerto No. 4
Piano Concerto No. 5
Piano Concerto No. 6
Emilia Gubitosi
Concerto for Piano and Orchestra (1943)

H 

Reynaldo Hahn
Piano Concerto in E (1930)
Hermann Haller
Concerto for Piano and Orchestra (1959)
Concerto No. 2 for Piano and String Orchestra (1962)
Ilmari Hannikainen
Piano Concerto in B flat minor (1917)
Howard Hanson
Piano Concerto in G, Op. 36 (1948)
Lou Harrison
Piano Concerto (1985)
Hamilton Harty
Piano Concerto in B minor (1922)
Fumio Hayasaka
Piano Concerto (1948)
Joseph Haydn
Concerto in C, Hob. XVIII/1 (1756)
Concerto in F, Hob. XVIII/3 (c. 1765)
Concerto in G, Hob. XVIII/4 (before 1782)
Concerto in C, Hob. XVIII/5 (before 1763)
Concerto in F, Hob. XVIII/7 (before 1766)
Concerto in G, Hob. XVIII/9 (before 1767)
Concerto in C, Hob. XVIII/10 (c. 1760)
Concerto in D, Hob. XVIII/11 (before 1782) – this is the one usually known as the Haydn Concerto
Concerto in C, Hob. XVIII/12
Concerto in F, Hob. XVIII/6, for piano, violin and strings (before 1766)
Christopher Headington
Piano Concerto
Adolf von Henselt
Piano Concerto in F minor, Op. 16 (1839–47)
Variations de Concert on Quand je quittai la Normandie from Meyerbeer's Robert le Diable, Op. 11
Hans Werner Henze
Piano Concerto No. 1 (1950)
Piano Concerto No. 2 (1967)
Tristan, preludes for piano, electronic tapes and orchestra (1973)
Requiem for piano and chamber orchestra (1990)
Henri Herz
Piano Concerto No. 1 in A, Op. 34 (1828)
Piano Concerto No. 2 in C minor, Op. 74 (1834)
Piano Concerto No. 3 in D minor, Op. 87 (1835)
Piano Concerto No. 4 in E, Op. 131 (1843)
Piano Concerto No. 5 in F minor, Op. 180 (1854)
Piano Concerto No. 6 in A minor, Op. 192 (1858), with chorus
Piano Concerto No. 7 in B minor, Op. 207 (1864)
Piano Concerto No. 8 in A-flat, Op. 218 (1873)
Jennifer Higdon
Piano Concerto (2006)
Paul Hindemith
Klaviermusik mit Orchester, Op. 29 (1923, for left hand only)
Kammermusik II Concerto for piano and twelve solo instruments, Op. 36/1 (1924)
Concert Music for Piano, Brass and Two Harps, Op. 49 (1930)
The Four Temperaments (1940)
Piano Concerto (1945)
Alun Hoddinott
Concerto for Piano, Winds and Percussion, Op. 19 (1961)
Concerto No. 2, Op. 21 (1960)
Concerto No. 3, Op. 44 (1966)
Josef Hofmann
Chromatikon, for piano and orchestra
Joseph Holbrooke
Piano Concerto No. 1, Op. 52 The Song of Gwyn ap Nudd (1906-8)
Piano Concerto No. 2, Op. 100 L'Orient
Arthur Honegger
Concertino (1924)
Alan Hovhaness
Lousadzak for piano and string orchestra, Op. 48 (1944)
Herbert Howells
Piano Concerto No. 2 in C minor (1925)
Johann Nepomuk Hummel
Piano Concerto in A, s4 / WoO. 24 (1790s)
Piano Concerto in A, s5 / WoO. 24a (1790s)
Piano Concerto in C, Op. 34a (1811)
Concertino in G, Op. 73
Piano Concerto in A minor, Op. 85 (1821)
Piano Concerto in B minor, Op. 89 (1819)
Piano Concerto in E, Op. 110, Les Adieux (1826)
Piano Concerto in A-flat, Op. 113 (1830)
Piano Concerto in F, Op. posth. 1 (1839)
Rondeau Brillant in A, Op. 56
Rondo Brillant on a Russian Folk Theme, Op. 98 (1822)
Variations Brillantes "Das Fest der Handwerken", Op. 115 (1830)
Oberons Zauberhorn: Grosse Fantasie, Op. 116 (1829)
Gesellschafts-Rondo in D, Op. 117
Le Retour de Londres – Grand Rondeau Brillant, Op. 127 (1830)
Double Concerto in G, Op. 17 for piano and violin
William Hurlstone
Piano Concerto in D
Henry Holden Huss
Piano Concerto in B, Op. 10

I 

Vincent d'Indy
Symphony on a French Mountain Air (Symphonie sur un chant montagnard français, Op. 25 (1886)
Triple Concerto for Piano, Flute, Cello and String Orchestra, Op. 89 (1927)
John Ireland
Piano Concerto in E-flat (1930)
Legend (1933)
Charles Ives
Emerson Concerto, reconstructed by David G. Porter from Ives' drafts of the Emerson Overture for Piano and Orchestra

J 

Gordon Jacob
Concerto for Three Hands
Leoš Janáček
Concertino (1925)
Capriccio for piano left hand, flute and brass ensemble 'Vzdor' (1926)
André Jolivet
Piano Concerto (1950)

K 

Dmitry Kabalevsky
Piano Concerto No. 1 in A minor, Op. 9 (1928)
Piano Concerto No. 2 in G minor, Op. 23 (1935)
Piano Concerto No. 3 in D, Op. 50 'Youth Concerto' (1952)
Piano Concerto No. 4 in C, Op. 99 'Prague' (1975) 
Robert Kahn
Konzertstücke, Op. 74 (1920)
Friedrich Kalkbrenner
Piano Concerto No. 1 in D minor, Op. 61 (1823)
Piano Concerto No. 2 in E minor, Op. 85 (1826)
Bravura Variations on "God Save the King", Op. 99 (1828)
Adagio ed allegro di bravura, Op. 102 (1828)
Piano Concerto No. 3 in A minor, Op. 107 (1829)
Le rêve, Grande fantaisie pour le piano forte avec accompagnement d'orchestre ad libitum, Op. 113 (c. 1831)
Grand Concerto for two pianos, Op. 125 (1833)
Piano Concerto No. 4 in A-flat major, Op. 127 (1835)
Nikolai Kapustin
Concertino for piano and orchestra, Op. 1 (1957)
Concerto for piano and orchestra No. 1, Op. 2 (1961)
Concerto for piano and orchestra No. 2, Op. 14 (1974)
Concerto for piano and orchestra No. 3, Op. 48 (1985)
Concerto for piano and orchestra No. 4, Op. 56 (1989)
Concerto for piano and orchestra No. 5, Op. 72 (1993)
Concerto for piano and orchestra No. 6, Op. 74 (1993)
Toccata for piano and orchestra, Op. 8 (1964)
Intermezzo for piano and orchestra, Op. 13 (1968)
Nocturne in G major for piano and orchestra, Op. 16 (1972)
Etude for piano and orchestra, Op. 19 (1974)
Nocturne for piano and orchestra, Op. 20 (1974)
Concert Rhapsody for piano and orchestra, Op. 25 (1976)
Scherzo for piano and orchestra, Op. 29 (1978)
Shigeru Kan-no
Piano Concerto No.1 (1997)
Piano Concerto No.2 (1999)
Piano Concerto No.3 (2006)
Hugo Kaun (1863-1932)
Piano Concerto No. 1 E-flat minor, Op. 50
Piano Concerto No. 2 C minor, Op. 115 (1925)
Nigel Keay
Diffractions for Piano and Orchestra (1987)
Aram Khachaturian
Concert-Rhapsody in D-flat, Op. 102 (1967)
Piano Concerto in D-flat (1936)
Tikhon Khrennikov
Piano Concerto No. 1 in F, Op. 1 (1933)
Piano Concerto No. 2 in C, Op. 21 (1972)
Piano Concerto No. 3 in C, Op. 28 (1983/84)
Friedrich Kiel
Piano Concerto in B-flat, Op. 30 (1864)
Wojciech Kilar
Symphony Concertante, for piano and orchestra (Symphony No. 2) (1956)
Piano Concerto No. 1 (1997)
Piano Concerto No. 2 (2011)
Reginald King
Fantasie for Piano and Orchestra (1946)
Charles Koechlin
Ballade for Piano and Orchestra
Siegfried Kohler
Piano Concerto Op. 46 (1971–72)
Erich Wolfgang Korngold
Piano Concerto in C-sharp for the left hand, Op. 17 (1923, commissioned by Paul Wittgenstein)
Leopold Kozeluch
Concerto for Two Pianos in B-flat major
Ernst Krenek
Piano Concerto No. 1 in F-sharp, Op. 18 (1923)
Piano Concerto No. 2, Op. 81 (1937)
Piano Concerto No. 3, Op. 107 (1946)
Piano Concerto No. 4 (1950)
Concerto for Two Pianos (1951)
Eduard Künneke
Piano Concerto No. 1 in A flat major, op. 36
Friedrich Kuhlau
Piano Concerto in C, Op. 7 (1810)
Theodor Kullak
Piano Concerto in C minor, Op. 55 (1850)
György Kurtág
Op. 27/1 – ... quasi una fantasia ... for piano and chamber ensemble (1987–88)
Op. 27/2 – Double Concerto for piano, cello and two chamber ensembles (1989–90)

L 

Sophie Lacaze
Concerto n°1 for piano and string orchestra (2002)
Helmut Lachenmann
Ausklang: Piano Concerto in F (1985)
Édouard Lalo
Piano Concerto in F minor (1889)
Constant Lambert
 The Rio Grande, for alto, piano, chorus, brass, strings and percussion (1927)
Concerto for piano and nine players (1931)
Marcel Landowski
Piano Concerto No. 2
Shawn Lane
Piano Concertino: Transformation of Themes (1992)
Henri Lazarof
Tableaux (after Kandinsky) for Piano and Orchestra
Ton de Leeuw
 Danses sacrées (1990)
 Dieter Lehnhoff
Piano Concerto No. 1, Op. 25 (2005)
Piano Concerto No. 2, Op. 29 (2007)
Kenneth Leighton
Piano Concerto No. 1, Op. 11 (1951)
Piano Concerto No. 2, Op. 37 (1960)
Piano Concerto No. 3, Op. 57 (1969)
Artur Lemba
Piano Concerto No. 1 in G major (1905)
Piano Concerto No. 2 in E minor (1931)
Piano Concerto No. 3 in F minor (1945)
Piano Concerto No. 4 in B major (1955)
Piano Concerto No. 5 (1960)
Theodor Leschetizky
Piano Concerto in C minor, Op. 9
Lowell Liebermann
Piano Concerto No. 1, Op. 12 (1983)
Piano Concerto No. 2, Op. 36 (1992)
Piano Concerto No. 3, Op. 95 (2006)
Rhapsody on a Theme of Paganini Op.72 (2001)
Peter Lieberson
Piano Concerto No. 1 (1983)
Red Garuda for piano and orchestra (1999)
Piano Concerto No. 3 (2003)
György Ligeti
Piano Concerto (1988)
Magnus Lindberg
Piano Concerto No. 1 (1994)
Piano Concerto No. 2 (2012)
Dinu Lipatti
 Concertino Op. 3
Romanian Dances for Piano and Orchestra
Franz Liszt
Piano Concerto No. 1 in E-flat, S. 124 (1835)
Piano Concerto No. 2 in A, S. 125 (1839)
Piano Concerto No. 3 in E-flat, Op. posth., S. 125a
Totentanz, S. 126 (1838–49, revised 1853 and 1859)
Grande symphonic Fantasie on themes from Berlioz's 'Lelio', S. 120
Fantasy on a Theme from Beethoven's The Ruins of Athens, S. 122 (1848–52)
Malediction for piano and string orchestra, S. 121
De Profundis – Psaume instrumental, S. 121a
Fantasy on Hungarian Folk Songs, S. 123 (1852)
Grand solo de concert, S. 365 (prepared by Leslie Howard)
Concerto pathétique in E minor, S. 365a
Hexaméron, S. 365b (orch. competed by Leslie Howard)
Transcription of Schubert's Wanderer Fantasy, S. 366 (1850–51)
Transcription of Weber's Polonaise brillante, S. 367 (1850–51)
Rapsodie espagnole, S. 254 (orch. Busoni)
Henry Litolff
Concerto Symphonique No. 1 in D minor, now lost
Concerto Symphonique No. 2 in B minor, Op. 22
Concerto Symphonique No. 3 in E-flat, Op. 45 (1846)
Concerto Symphonique No. 4 in D minor, Op. 102
Concerto Symphonique No. 5 in C minor, Op. 123 (1870)
George Lloyd
Piano Concerto No. 1 ('Scapegoat')
Piano Concerto No. 2
Piano Concerto No. 3
Carl Loewe
Piano Concerto No. 2 in A
Nikolai Lopatnikoff
Concerto for two Pianos and Orchestra (1949–50)
Bent Lorentzen
Piano Concerto
Witold Lutosławski
Piano Concerto (1987)
Variations on a Theme by Paganini (1978, orig. written 1941 for two pianos)
Sergei Lyapunov
Piano Concerto No. 1 in E-flat minor, Op. 4 (1886)
Piano Concerto No. 2 in E, Op. 38 (1909)
Rhapsody on Ukrainian Themes, Op. 28

M 

Edward MacDowell
Piano Concerto No. 1 in A minor, Op. 15 (1882)
Piano Concerto No. 2 in D minor, Op. 23 (1885)
Alexander Mackenzie
Scottish Concerto in G major, Op. 55 (1897)
James MacMillan
The Berserking for piano and orchestra (1990)
Piano Concerto No. 2 (2003)
Piano Concerto No. 3 (2008)
Frederik Magle
Symphonic Lego Fantasia for piano and orchestra (1995–96)
Gian Francesco Malipiero
Six Piano Concertos (1934–1964)
Dialoghi VII (Concerto) for Two Pianos and Orchestra (1956)
Otto Malling
Piano Concerto in C minor Op. 43 (1890)
Andrew March
Piano Concerto No. 1 (2013–19)
Frank Martin
Piano Concerto No. 1 in F minor (1934)
Piano Concerto No. 2 (1968–69)
Harpsichord Concerto (1951–52)
Ballade for piano and orchestra
Petite symphonie concertante for piano, harp, harpsichord and two string orchestras (1945)
Bohuslav Martinů
Piano Concerto No. 1 (1925)
Concertino for piano left hand and chamber orchestra, Op. 173 (1926)
Piano Concerto No. 2 (1934)
Concertino (1938)
Concerto for Two Pianos (1943)
Piano Concerto No. 3 (1948)
Piano Concerto No. 4 (1956, Incantations)
Piano Concerto No. 5 (1957, Fantasia concertante) (see )
 Harpsichord Concerto (1935)
Toccata e due Canzoni (1946)
Concertino (1933) for piano, violin, cello and string orchestra
Double Concerto for 2 String Orchestras, Piano and Timpani (1938)
Sinfonietta Giocosa (1940)
Sinfonietta La Jolla (1950)
Giuseppe Martucci
Piano Concerto in D minor Op. 40
Piano Concerto in B-flat minor Op. 66 (1884–85)
Joseph Marx
Romantisches Klavierkonzert in E
Castelli Romani (1930)
Jules Massenet
Piano Concerto in E-flat
André Mathieu
 Concertino No. 1
 Concertino No. 2
 Concerto No. 3, Quebec (1943)
 Concerto No.4 in E minor (1947)
 Romantic Rhapsody for Piano and Orchestra
John McCabe
Piano Concerto No. 1, Op. 43 (1966)
Piano Concerto No. 2
Piano Concertino (1968)
Piano Concerto No. 3, Dialogues (1976)
Nikolai Medtner
Piano Concerto No. 1 in C minor, Op. 33 (1914–18)
Piano Concerto No. 2 in C minor, Op. 50 (1920–27)
Piano Concerto No. 3 in E minor, Op. 60 (1940–43)
Henryk Melcer-Szczawiński
 Concerto for Piano and Orchestra No. 1 in E minor (1895)
 Concerto for Piano and Orchestra No. 2 in C minor (1898)
Felix Mendelssohn
Piano Concerto in A minor (1822)
Concerto in E for two pianos (1823)
Concerto in A-flat for two pianos (1824)
Piano Concerto No. 1 in G minor, Op. 25 (1831)
Piano Concerto No. 2 in D minor, Op. 40 (1837)
Capriccio Brillant in B minor, Op. 22 (1832)
Rondo Brillant in E-flat major, Op. 29 (1834)
Serenade and Allegro giocoso in B minor, Op. 43 (1838)
Concerto for Violin and Piano in D minor (1823)
Peter Mennin
Concerto for Piano and Orchestra (1957)
Giancarlo Menotti
Piano Concerto in F
Olivier Messiaen
Turangalîla-Symphonie, solo piano, Ondes Martenot and orchestra (1946–48)
Réveil des Oiseaux ("Dawn chorus"), solo piano and orchestra (1953)
Oiseaux exotiques ("Exotic birds"), solo piano and orchestra (1955–56)
Sept haïkaï ("Seven haikus"), solo piano and orchestra (1962)
Couleurs de la cité céleste ("Colours of the Celestial City"), solo piano and ensemble (1963)
Un vitrail et des oiseaux ("Stained-glass window and birds"), piano solo, brass, wind and percussion (1986)
La ville d'en-haut ("The city on high"), piano solo, brass, wind and percussion (1987)
Concert à quatre, for four soloists – piano, cello, flute, oboe – and orchestra (1990–91, completed Loriod and Benjamin)
Trois petites Liturgies de la Présence Divine (1943–44)
La Transfiguration de Notre Seigneur Jésus (1965–69), for solo piano, solo cello, solo flute, solo clarinet, solo xylorimba, solo vibraphone, large 10-part choir and large orchestra
Peter Mieg
Concerto for 2 pianos and orchestra (1939–41)
Piano Concerto No. 1 (1947)
Piano Concerto No. 2 (1961)
Concerto pour piano à quatre mains et orchestre à cordes (1980)
Darius Milhaud
Piano Concerto No. 1, Op. 127 (1933)
Piano Concerto No. 2, Op. 225 (1941)
Concerto for 2 (or 3) Pianos, Op. 228 (1941)
Piano Concerto No. 3, Op. 270 (1946)
Piano Concerto No. 4, Op. 295 (1949)
Concertino d'automne, for 2 pianos and 8 instruments, Op. 309 (1951)
Piano Concerto No. 5, Op. 346 (1955)
Ballade, Op. 61 (1920)
5 Études, Op. 63 (1920)
Le Carnaval d'Aix, Op. 83b (1926)
Fantaisie pastorale, Op. 188 (1938)
Suite, Op. 300, for 2 (or 3) Pianos and Orchestra (1950)
Suite concertante, Op. 278b (1952)
Eric Moe
Kicking and Screaming for piano and 10 players (1994)
E. J. Moeran
Rhapsody in F-sharp minor for Piano and Orchestra (1943)
Robert Moevs
Concerto Grosso for Piano, Percussion, and Orchestra (1960–68)
Richard Mohaupt
Concerto for Piano and Orchestra (1938, rev. 1942)
Georg Matthias Monn
Harpsichord concerto in G minor (18th Century)
Harpsichord concerto in D major (18th Century)
Xavier Montsalvatge
Concerto Breve
Ennio Morricone
Musica for piano and string orchestra (1954)
Ignaz Moscheles
Piano Concerto No. 1 in F, Op. 45 (1818)
Piano Concerto No. 2 in E-flat, Op. 56
Piano Concerto No. 3 in G minor, Op. 58
Piano Concerto No. 4 in E, Op. 64 (1823)
Piano Concerto No. 5 in C, Op. 87 (1826–31)
Piano Concerto No. 6 in B-flat, Op. 90 Fantastique (1834)
Piano Concerto No. 7 in C minor, Op. 93 Pathétique (1835)
Piano Concerto No. 8 in D, Pastorale, Op. 96 (1838) – the orchestral parts for this Concerto have been lost
Recollections of Ireland, Op. 69
Anticipations of Scotland: A Grand Fantasia, Op. 70
Mihály Mosonyi
Piano Concerto in E minor
Moritz Moszkowski
Piano Concerto No. 1 in B minor, Op. 3
Piano Concerto No. 2 in E Major, Op.59
Wolfgang Amadeus Mozart – wrote twenty seven concertos, of which Nos. 1–4 are arrangements of sonata movements by other composers.
Piano Concerto No. 1 in F, K. 37 (1767)
Piano Concerto No. 2 in B-flat, K. 39 (1767)
Piano Concerto No. 3 in D, K. 40 (1767)
Piano Concerto No. 4 in G, K. 41 (1767)
Piano Concerto No. 5 in D, K. 175 (1773)
Piano Concerto No. 6 in B-flat, K. 238 (1776)
Concerto for 3 Pianos No. 7 in F major, K.242 (1776), the Lodron
Piano Concerto No. 8 in C, K. 246 (1776), the Lützow
Piano Concerto No. 9 in E-flat, K. 271 (1777), the Jeunehomme
Concerto for Two Pianos in E-flat, K. 365 (1779)
Piano Concerto No. 11 in F, K. 413 (1783)
Piano Concerto No. 12 in A, K. 414 (1782)
Piano Concerto No. 13 in C, K. 415 (1783)
Piano Concerto No. 14 in E-flat, K. 449 (1784)
Piano Concerto No. 15 in B-flat, K. 450 (1784)
Piano Concerto No. 16 in D, K. 451 (1784)
Piano Concerto No. 17 in G, K. 453 (1784)
Piano Concerto No. 18 in B-flat, K. 456 (1784)
Piano Concerto No. 19 in F, K. 459 (1784)
Piano Concerto No. 20 in D minor, K. 466 (1785)
Piano Concerto No. 21 in C, K. 467 (1785)
Piano Concerto No. 22 in E-flat, K. 482 (1785)
Piano Concerto No. 23 in A, K. 488 (1786)
Piano Concerto No. 24 in C minor, K. 491 (1786)
Piano Concerto No. 25 in C, K. 503 (1786)
Piano Concerto No. 26 in D, K. 537 (1788), the Coronation
Piano Concerto No. 27 in B-flat, K. 595 (1791)
Concert Rondo No. 1 in D, K. 382 (1782)
Concert Rondo No. 2 in A, K. 386 (1782)
Dominic Muldowney
Piano Concerto (1982)

N 

Eduard Nápravník
Concerto symphonique in A minor Op 27 (1877)
Fantaisie russe in B minor Op 39 (1881)
Per Nørgård
Concerto in due tempi, for piano & orchestra (1994)
Vítězslav Novák
Piano Concerto in E Minor (1895)
Michael Nyman
The Piano Concerto

O 

Hisato Ohzawa
Piano Concerto No. 3 'Kamikaze' (1938)
Franco Oppo
Piano Concerto n.1 (1995)
Leo Ornstein
Piano Concerto (1925)

P 

Pavel Pabst
Piano Concerto in E flat major, Op. 82 (1882)
Ignacy Jan Paderewski
Piano Concerto in A minor, Op. 17 (1888)
Fantaisie Polonaise, Op. 19 (1893)
Carter Pann
Piano Concerto (1996–97)
Giovanni Paisiello
Concerto for Piano and Orchestra, No. 1 in C major
Concerto for Piano and Orchestra, No. 2 in F major
Concerto for Piano and Orchestra, No. 3 in A major
Concerto for Piano and Orchestra, No. 4 in G minor
Concerto for Piano and Orchestra, No. 5 in D major
Concerto for Piano and Orchestra, No. 6 in B-flat major
Concerto for Piano and Orchestra, No. 7 in A major
Concerto for Piano and Orchestra, No. 8 in C major
Selim Palmgren
Piano Concerto No. 1 in G minor, Op. 13 (1903)
Piano Concerto No. 2, Op. 33 'The River' (1913)
Piano Concerto No. 3 in F major, Op. 41 'Metamorphoses' (1915)
Piano Concerto No. 4, Op. 85 'April' (1926)
Piano Concerto No. 5 in A major, Op. 99 (1941)
Andrzej Panufnik
Piano Concerto (1964, recomposed 1972)
Hubert Parry
Piano Concerto in F-sharp major (1878–79)
Arvo Pärt
Credo for Piano, Mixed Chorus, and Orchestra (1968)
Lamentate for piano and orchestra (2002)
Dora Pejačević
Piano Concerto in G minor Op. 33 (1913)
Phantasie Concertante in D minor for Piano and Orchestra, op. 48 (1919)
Krzysztof Penderecki
Piano Concerto (2002)
Vincent Persichetti
Concertino, Op. 16 (1941)
Piano Concerto, Op. 90 (1962)
Hans Pfitzner
Piano Concerto in E-flat, Op. 31 (1922)
Tobias Picker
Piano Concerto No. 1 (1980)
Keys to the City (Piano Concerto No. 2) (1983)
Piano Concerto No. 3: Kilauea (1986)
Bang! for amplified piano and orchestra (1992)
Gabriel Pierné
Piano Concerto in C minor, Op. 12 (1886)
Fantaisie-Ballet in B-flat, Op. 6 (1885)
Scherzo-Caprice in D, Op. 25 (1890)
Poème Symphonique in D minor, Op. 37 (1903)
Walter Piston
Concertino (1937)
Concerto for Two Pianos and Orchestra (1964)
Ildebrando Pizzetti
Canti Della Stagione Alta (Concerto) (1930)
Manuel Ponce
Piano Concerto (1912)
Francis Poulenc
Concerto for Two Pianos (1932)
Piano Concerto (1949)
Aubade (1929) choreographic Concerto for piano and eighteen instruments
Concert champêtre (1927–28) for harpsichord and orchestra (also in version for piano and orchestra)
Gerhard Präsent
Configurations - Piano Concerto (1981/82)
André Previn
Piano Concerto (1986)
Sergei Prokofiev
Piano Concerto No. 1 in D-flat, Op. 10 (1912)
Piano Concerto No. 2 in G minor, Op. 16 (1913, rewritten 1923)
Piano Concerto No. 3 in C, Op. 26 (1917–21), his best known
Piano Concerto No. 4 in B-flat, Op. 53 (1931), for the left hand (written for Paul Wittgenstein)
Piano Concerto No. 5 in G, Op. 55 (1932)
Piano Concerto No. 6 (1953, incomplete), for two pianos and strings

Q

R 

Sergei Rachmaninoff
Piano Concerto No. 1 in F-sharp minor, Op. 1 (1891)
Piano Concerto No. 2 in C minor, Op. 18 (1901)
Piano Concerto No. 3 in D minor, Op. 30 (1909)
Piano Concerto No. 4 in G minor, Op. 40 (1926)
Rhapsody on a Theme of Paganini, Op. 43 (1934)
Concerto Élégiaque, Op. 9b (an orchestration of Rachmaninoff's Trio élégiaque No. 2 by Alan Kogosowski)
Suite No. 1 (Fantasy), Op. 5 (orch. R. Harkness)
Suite No. 2, Op. 17, Op. 17 (orch. L. Holby)
Joachim Raff
Piano Concerto in C minor, Op. 185 (1873)
Ode to Spring, Op. 76 (1857)
Suite in E-flat, Op. 200
Behzad Ranjbaran
Piano Concerto (2008)
Einojuhani Rautavaara
Piano Concerto No. 1, Op. 45 (1969)
Piano Concerto No. 2 (1989)
Piano Concerto No. 3 'Gift of Dreams' (1998), written for pianist Vladimir Ashkenazy
Maurice Ravel
Piano Concerto in G (1931)
Piano Concerto in D for the Left Hand (1931, written for Paul Wittgenstein)
Alan Rawsthorne
Piano Concerto No. 1 (1943)
Piano Concerto No. 2 (1951)
Concerto for Two Pianos and Orchestra (1968)
Max Reger
Piano Concerto in F minor, Op. 114 (1910)
Carl Reinecke
Piano Concerto No. 1 in F-sharp minor, Op. 72 (1860)
Piano Concerto No. 2 in E minor, Op. 120 (1872)
Piano Concerto No. 3 in C, Op. 144 (1877)
Piano Concerto No. 4 in B minor, Op. 254 (1901)
Konzertstück in G minor, Op. 33 (1848)
Ottorino Respighi
Piano Concerto in A minor, P. 40 (1902)
Concerto in Modo Misolidio, P. 145 (1925)
Fantasia slava in G, P. 50 (1903)
Toccata, P. 156 (1928)
Josef Rheinberger
Piano Concerto in A-flat, Op. 94 (1876)
Ferdinand Ries
Piano Concerto No. 2 in E-flat major, Op. 42 (1812)
Swedish National Airs and Variations, Op. 52 (1812)
Piano Concerto No. 3 in C-sharp minor, Op. 55 (1812)
Piano Concerto No. 4 in C minor, Op. 115 (1809)
Grand Variations on " Rule Britannia", Op. 116 (1817)
Piano Concerto No. 5 in D major, Op. 120 "Concerto pastoral" (c. 1815-17; publ. 1823)
Piano Concerto No. 6 in C major, Op. 123 (1806; publ. c. 1824)
Piano Concerto No. 7 in a minor, Op. 132 "Abschieds-Concert von England" (1823)
Introduction et Rondeau brillant, Op. 144 (1825)
Piano Concerto No. 8 in A-flat major, Op. 151 "Gruss an den Rhein" (1826; publ. 1827)
Introduction et Variations Brillantes, Op. 170 (1817; publ. c. 1832)
Introduction and Polonaise, Op. 174 (1833)
Piano Concerto No. 9 in G minor, Op. 177 (c. 1833)
Introduction et Rondeau brilant, WoO54 (1835)
Nikolai Rimsky-Korsakov
Piano Concerto in C-sharp minor, Op. 30 (1882)
Leroy Robertson
Piano Concerto (1966)
Joaquín Rodrigo
Concierto heroico (1942)
Julius Röntgen
 Piano Concerto in G minor (1873)
 Piano Concerto in D major, Op. 18 (1879)
 Piano Concerto in D minor (1887)
 Piano Concerto in F major (1906)
 Piano Concerto in E major (1929)
 Two Piano Concertos: No. 1 in E minor and No. 2 in C major (1929/30)
Ned Rorem
Piano Concerto No. 2 (1950)
Concerto in Six Movements
Piano Concerto No. 4 for the Left Hand (1991)
Nino Rota
Fantasy for piano and orchestra on twelve notes from "non si pasce di cibo mortale chi si pasce di cibo celeste" from the second act of W.A. Mozart's Don Giovanni
Concerto soiree for piano and orchestra
Concerto in E minor for piano and orchestra (piccolo mondo antico)
Concerto in C major for piano and orchestra
Christopher Rouse
Seeing for piano and orchestra (1998)
Albert Roussel
Concerto in C, Op. 36 (1927)
Alec Rowley
Concerto for Piano, Strings and Percussion, Op. 49 (1938)
Edmund Rubbra
Sinfonia Concertante, Op. 38 (1936, revised 1943)
Piano Concerto in G, Op. 85 (1956)
Anton Rubinstein
Piano Concerto (1847), 1 movement only
Piano Concerto in C (1849), revised as Octet in D, Op. 9 (1856)
Piano Concerto No. 1 in E minor, Op. 25 (1850)
Piano Concerto No. 2 in F, Op. 35 (1851)
Piano Concerto No. 3 in G, Op. 45 (1853-4)
Piano Concerto No. 4 in D minor, Op. 70 (1864)
Piano Concerto No. 5 in E-flat, Op. 94 (1874)
Piano Fantasia in C, Op. 84 (1869)
Konzertstück in A-flat, Op. 113
Russian Capriccio, Op. 120 (1878)
Caprice russe, Op. 102
Poul Ruders
Piano Concerto No. 1 (1994)
Piano Concerto No. 2 (2009)
Frederic Rzewski
A Long Time Man (24 variations on the prison song "It Makes a Long Time Man Feel Bad") (1979)

S 

Shigeaki Saegusa
Piano Concerto (1971)
P. Peter Sacco
Piano Concerto No. 1 (1964)
Camille Saint-Saëns
Piano Concerto No. 1 in D, Op. 17 (1858)
Piano Concerto No. 2 in G minor, Op. 22 (1868)
Piano Concerto No. 3 in E-flat, Op. 29 (1869)
Piano Concerto No. 4 in C minor, Op. 44 (1873)
Piano Concerto No. 5 in F, Op. 103 (1895), the Egyptian
'Africa,' Fantaisie, Op. 89, for piano and orchestra
'Wedding Cake,' Op. 76, caprice-valse for piano and orchestra
Allegro appassionato, Op. 70, for piano and orchestra
Rhapsodie d'Auvergne, Op. 73
Le carnaval des animaux (2 pianos; 1886)
Antonio Salieri
Piano Concerto in C major (1773)
Piano Concerto in B-flat major (1773)
Siegfried Salomon
Piano Concerto in A minor Op. 54 (1947)
Esa-Pekka Salonen
Piano Concerto (2007)
Emil von Sauer
Piano Concerto No. 1 in E minor
Piano Concerto No. 2 in C minor
Ahmed Adnan Saygun
Piano Concerto No. 1, Op. 34
Piano Concerto No. 2, Op. 71
Xaver Scharwenka
Piano Concerto No. 1 in B-flat minor, Op. 32 (1877)
Piano Concerto No. 2 in C minor, Op. 56 (1880)
Piano Concerto No. 3 in C-sharp minor, Op. 80 (1898)
Piano Concerto No. 4 in F minor, Op. 82
Ernest Schelling
Suite Fantastique, Op. 7
Impressions from an Artist's Life (1913)
Franz Schmidt
Concertante Variations on a Theme of Beethoven (1923)
Piano Concerto No. 2 in E-flat for the Left Hand (1934)
Alfred Schnittke
Piano Concerto (No. 1), for piano and orchestra (1960)
Piano Concerto (No. 2), for piano and chamber orchestra (1964)
Piano Concerto (No. 3), for piano and strings (1979)
Piano Concerto (No. 4), for one piano four hands and chamber orchestra (1988)
Arnold Schoenberg
Piano Concerto (1942)
Ervin Schulhoff
Concerto for Piano and Small Orchestra
Piano Concerto Op. 11
William Schuman
Piano Concerto (1930, rev. 1942)
Clara Schumann
Piano Concerto in A minor, Op. 7 (1832-3)
Robert Schumann
Piano Concerto in A minor, Op. 54 (1845)
Introduction and Allegro Appassionato, Op. 92
Introduction and Allegro, Op. 134
Ludvig Schytte
Piano Concerto in C-sharp minor Op. 28 (c. 1884)
Cyril Scott
Piano Concerto
Alexander Scriabin
Piano Concerto in F-sharp minor, Op. 20 (1896)
Fantasia in A minor (1889)
Prometheus: The Poem of Fire, Op. 60 (1909–10)
Peter Sculthorpe
Piano Concerto (1983)
Peter Seabourne
Piano Concerto No. 1 (2003)
Piano Concerto No. 2 (2005)
Roger Sessions
Piano Concerto (1956)
Giovanni Sgambati
Piano Concerto in G minor, Op. 15 (1885)
Dmitri Shostakovich
Piano Concerto No. 1 in C minor, Op. 35 (1933), also includes a part for solo trumpet
Piano Concerto No. 2 in F, Op. 102 (1957)
Sheila Silver
Concerto for Piano and Orchestra (1996)
Rudolph Simonsen
Piano Concerto in F minor (1915)
Christian Sinding
Piano Concerto in D-flat, Op. 6 (1887–89, revised 1901)
Nikos Skalkottas
Piano Concerto No. 1 (1931)
Piano Concerto No. 2 (1937)
Piano Concerto No. 3 (1939)
Piano Concerto (1948–49)
Roger Smalley
Concerto for Piano and Orchestra (1984–85)
 Arthur Somervell
Piano Concerto in A minor (1921)
 Kaikhosru Shapurji Sorabji
 Piano Concerto No. 1 (1915–16)
 Piano Concerto No. 2 (1916–17; only two-piano version survives)
 Piano Concerto No. 3 (1918)
 Piano Concerto No. 4 (1918)
 Piano Concerto No. 5 (1920)
 Piano Concerto No. 6 (1922)
 Piano Concerto No. 7, Simorg-Anka (1924)
 Piano Concerto No. 8 (1927–28)
 Symphonic Variations for Piano and Orchestra (1935–37, 1953–56)
 Opus clavisymphonicum—Concerto for Piano and Large Orchestra (1957–59)
 Opusculum clavisymphonicum vel claviorchestrale (1973–75)
Leo Smit
Piano Concerto (1937)
Charles Villiers Stanford
Piano Concerto in B-flat major, Op. posth (1873)
Piano Concerto No. 1 in G, Op. 59
Piano Concerto No. 2 in C minor, Op. 126
Piano Concerto No. 3 in E flat, Op. 171 (1919)
Concert Variations on "Down among the Dead Men", Op. 71 (1898)
Bernhard Stavenhagen
Piano Concerto in B minor, Op. 4 (1894)
Wilhelm Stenhammar
Piano Concerto No. 1 in B-flat minor, Op. 1 (1893)
Piano Concerto No. 2 in D minor, Op. 23 (1905–07)
Zygmunt Stojowski
Piano Concerto No. 1 in F-sharp minor, Op. 3 (1890)
Piano Concerto No. 2 in A-flat, Op. 32 (1909–10)
Rhapsodie symphonique, Op. 23 (1904)
Oscar Strasnoy
"Kuleshov", for solo piano and chamber orchestra (2017)
Richard Strauss
Burleske in D minor (1885–86)
Parergon zur Sinfonia Domestica, Op. 73 (piano left-hand; 1924–25)
Panathenaenzug, Op. 74 (piano left-hand; 1926–27)
Igor Stravinsky
Concerto for Piano and Wind Instruments (1923-24/51)
Capriccio for Piano and Orchestra (1928-9)
Five Movements for Piano and Orchestra (1958-9)
Stjepan Šulek
Piano Concerto No. 1 (1949)
Piano Concerto No. 2 (1952)
Piano Concerto No. 3 (1970)
Tomáš Svoboda
Concerto No. 1 for Piano and Orchestra, Op. 71 (1974)
Concerto No. 2 for Piano and Orchestra, Op. 134 (1989)
Karol Szymanowski
Symphony No. 4, Symphonie Concertante

T 

Emil Tabakov
Concerto for Piano and Orchestra
Tōru Takemitsu
Arc (1963)
Asterism (1968)
Quatrain for violin, clarinet, cello, piano soloists and orchestra (1975)
Riverrun (1984)
Otar Taktakishvili
Four piano Concertos
Josef Tal
Concerto No. 1 for piano & orchestra (1945)
Concerto No. 2 for piano & orchestra (1953)
Concerto No. 3 for tenor, piano and chamber orchestra (1956)
Double Concerto for two pianos & orchestra (1979)
Tan Dun
Piano Concerto "The Fire"
Sergei Taneyev
Piano Concerto in E-flat (1876; reconstruction)
Alexander Tansman
Suite for Two Pianos and Orchestra (1928)
John Tavener
Palintropos (1978)
Boris Tchaikovsky
Piano Concerto in C minor, 1971
Pyotr Ilyich Tchaikovsky
Piano Concerto No. 1 in B-flat minor, Op. 23 (1874)
Piano Concerto No. 2 in G, Op. 44 (1880)
Piano Concerto No. 3 in E-flat, Op. 75 (1893)
Concert Fantasia in G, Op. 56 (1883)
Andante and Finale in B-flat, Op. 79 (1893)
Alexander Tcherepnin
Piano Concerto No. 1, Op. 12
Piano Concerto No. 2, Op. 26
Piano Concerto No. 3, Op. 48
Piano Concerto No. 4 (Fantaisie), Op. 78
Piano Concerto No. 5, Op. 96
Piano Concerto No. 6, Op. 99
Nikolai Tcherepnin
Piano Concerto in C# minor, Op. 30 (1905)
Sigismond Thalberg
Piano Concerto in F minor, Op. 5
Ferdinand Thieriot (1838-1919)
Piano Concerto No. 1 in B-flat (1885)
Piano Concerto No. 2 in C minor (1904)
Ludwig Thuille
Piano Concerto in D major (1882)
Michael Tippett
Piano Concerto (1955)
Fantasy on a Theme by Handel (1942)
Loris Tjeknavorian
Piano Concerto, Op. 4 (1960-61 rev 1974)
Zlata Tkach
Concerto for Piano and Orchestra (2002) 'In memory of victims of Kishinev Pogrom 1903'
Václav Tomášek
Piano Concerto in C major
Piano Concerto in E-flat major
Piano Concerto (1994)
Donald Tovey
Piano Concerto in A, Op. 15 (1903)
Joan Tower
Concerto for Piano (Homage to Beethoven) (1985)
Rapids (Piano Concerto No. 2) (1996)
Daniil Trifonov
Piano Concerto in E-flat minor (2014)
Joaquín Turina
Rapsodia Sinfónica (1931)
Geirr Tveitt
Piano Concerto No. 1 in F major, Op. 1 (1927)
Piano Concerto No. 2 (lost; MS destroyed in a house fire)
Piano Concerto No. 3 'Hommage a Brahms', Op. 126 (lost; MS destroyed in house fire, but being reconstructed from recording)
Piano Concerto No. 4 'Aurora Borealis', Op. 130 (lost, but reconstructed from surviving orchestral parts, two piano reduction, and recording; 1947)
Piano Concerto No. 5, Op. 156 (1954)
Piano Concerto No. 6 (lost; MS destroyed in a house fire)
Variations on a Folksong from Hardanger for two pianos and orchestra (1949)

U 

Viktor Ullmann
Klavierkonzert, Op. 25 (1939)
Unsuk Chin
Piano Concerto (1997)
Galina Ustvolskaya
Concerto for Piano, String Orchestra and Timpani

V 

Ralph Vaughan Williams
Piano Concerto (1933 – also exists in a version for two pianos and orchestra of 1946)
Fantasia (Quasi Variazione) on the "Old 104th" Psalm Tune (1949)
José Vianna da Motta
Piano Concerto in A (1886–87)
Fantasia Dramática
Louis Vierne
Poème, Op. 50 (1926?)
Heitor Villa-Lobos
Piano Concerto No. 1 (1945)
Piano Concerto No. 2 (1948)
Piano Concerto No. 3 (1952–57)
Piano Concerto No. 4 (1952)
Piano Concerto No. 5 (1954)
Suite for piano and orchestra
Momoprecoce, fantasy for piano and orchestra (1929)
Chôros No. 8, for two pianos and orchestra (1925)
Chôros No. 11, for piano and orchestra (1928)
Bachianas Brasileiras No. 3
Carl Vine
Piano Concerto No. 1 (1997)
Piano Concerto No. 2 (2012)

W 

William Walton
Sinfonia Concertante (1928, revised 1944)
Carl Maria von Weber
Piano Concerto No. 1 in C, J. 98 (1810)
Piano Concerto No. 2 in E-flat, J. 155 (1815)
Konzertstück in F minor, Op. 79, J. 282 (1821)
Douglas Weiland
Piano Concerto, Op. 31
Judith Weir
Piano Concerto (1997)
Mark Wessel
Piano Concerto (1941)
Poem, for orchestra and piano solo (1924)
Scherzo burlesque, for piano and orchestra (c. 1931)
Symphony Concertante, for piano and horn with orchestra (1929)
Charles-Marie Widor
Piano Concerto No. 1 in F minor, Op. 39 (1880)
Piano Concerto No. 2 in C, Op. 77 (1905)
Fantaisie in A-flat, Op. 62 (1892)
Jozef Wieniawski
Piano Concerto in G minor Op 20 (1859)
Adolf Wiklund
Piano Concerto No. 1 in E minor, Op. 10
Piano Concerto No. 2 in B minor, Op. 17
John Williams
Scherzo for Piano and Orchestra (2014)
Malcolm Williamson
Piano Concerto No. 1 (1956–58)
Piano Concerto No. 2 (1960)
Piano Concerto No. 3 (1962)
Concerto for Two Pianos and String Orchestra (1972–73)
Piano Concerto No. 4 (1991–94)
Sinfonia Concertante (1958–60), for piano, 3 trumpets and string orchestra
Thomas Wilson
Piano Concerto
Haydn Wood
Piano Concerto in D minor (1909)
Charles Wuorinen
Piano Concerto (1966)
Second Concerto: for Amplified Piano and Orchestra (1974)
Third Piano Concerto (1983)
Fourth Piano Concerto (2003)
Flying to Kahani (2005)
Time Regained, concert piece for piano and orchestra based on early music, Machaut, Matteo di Perugia, Dufay and Gibbons (2008)

X 

Iannis Xenakis
Synaphaï (Connexities), for piano and orchestra (1969)
Erikhthon, for piano and orchestra (1974)
Keqrops, for piano and orchestra (1986)

Y 

Richard Yardumian
Passacaglia, Recitative and Fugue, a Concerto for piano and orchestra (premiered 1958, Rudolf Firkušný, Philadelphia Orchestra, conducted by Eugene Ormandy.)
Akio Yashiro
Piano Concerto
Yin Chengzong et al.
Yellow River Piano Concerto (arrangement of themes from Xian Xinghai's Yellow River Cantata)
Takashi Yoshimatsu
Threnody to Toki for piano and string orchestra, Op. 12 (1980)
"Memo Flora" for Piano and Orchestra, Op. 67 (1997)
When an angel fals into a doze... for piano and string orchestra, Op. 73 (1998)
"Cepheus Note" for Piano Left Hand and Chamber Orchestra, Op. 102 (2007)
Benjamin Yusupov
Concerto-Intimo for piano and orchestra (2005)
Con Moto for piano and string orchestra (2007)

Z 

Aaron Zigman
Tango Manos (2019)
Efrem Zimbalist
Piano Concerto in E-flat (composed 1953 for William Kapell, destroyed in the air crash in which the pianist died, reconstructed by the composer)
Ellen Taaffe Zwilich
Piano Concerto (1986)
Millennium Fantasy (2000)

Works for orchestra or large ensemble with less important or modest piano part 
John Adams
Common Tones in Simple Time (1979)
Harmonielehre (1985)
The Chairman Dances (1985)
Tromba Lontana (1986)
Nixon in China (1987)
Fearful Symmetries (1988)
Lollapalooza (1995)
Slonimsky's Earbox (1996)
Naive and Sentimental Music (1998)
Guide to Strange Places (2001)
My Father Knew Charles Ives (2003)
The Dharma at Big Sur, for electric violin and orchestra (2003)
City Noir (2009)
Absolute Jest, for string quartet and orchestra (2012)
The Gospel According to the Other Mary (2013)
Saxophone Concerto (2013)
Girls of the Golden West (2017)
Samuel Barber
Violin Concerto (1939)
Béla Bartók
Dance Suite (1923)
The Miraculous Mandarin (1924)
Music for String, Percussion, and Celesta (1936)
Leonard Bernstein
Symphony No. 1 "Jeremiah" (1942)
Three Dance Episodes from On the Town (1945)
Symphonic Suite from On the Waterfront (1954)
Symphonic Dances from West Side Story (1960)
Slava! A Political Overture (1977)
Ernest Bloch
Concerto Grosso No. 1 (1925)
Aaron Copland
Symphony for Organ and Orchestra (1924)
El Salón México (1936)
The Second Hurricane (1937)
Billy the Kid (1938)
Four Dance Episodes from Rodeo (1942)
Appalachian Spring (1944)
Letter from Home (1944)
Symphony No. 3 (1946)
The Tender Land (1954)
Connotations (1962)
Inscape (1964)
Morton Feldman
Viola in My Life IV for viola and orchestra
George Gershwin
Blue Monday (1922)
Porgy and Bess (1935)
Catfish Row (Suite from Porgy and Bess) (1936)
Philip Glass
 Symphony No. 1 Low (1993)
 Symphony No. 4 Heroes (1996)
 Symphony No. 7 Toltec for orchestra and chorus (2005)
 Symphony No. 8 (2005)
 Symphony No. 9 (2011)
 Symphony No. 10 (2012)
 Symphony No. 11 (2017)
 Symphony No. 12 Lodger (2019)
Percy Grainger
Hill Song No. 1 (1902)
In A Nutshell suite (1916)
Children's March: "Over the Hills and Far Away" (1919)
Charles Ives
A Set of Pieces for Theatre Orchestra (1915)
Symphony No. 4 (1916)
Three Places in New England (1912–16)
Aram Khachaturian
Gayane (1939–41)
Symphony No. 2 (1944)
Spartacus (1950–54)
William Kraft
Concerto for Timpani and Orchestra (1984)
Frederik Magle
Cantabile – symphonic suite (2004–09)
Gustav Mahler
Symphony No. 8 in E-flat major, "Symphony of a Thousand" (1906–07)
Arturo Márquez
Danzón No. 1 (1994)
Danzón No. 2 (1994)
Danzón No. 4 (1996)
Danzón No. 9 (2017)
Frank Martin
Ballade pour saxophone and orchestre (1938/39)
Bohuslav Martinů
Symphony No. 1 (1942)
Symphony No. 2 (1943)
Symphony No. 3 (1944)
Symphony No. 4 (1945)
Symphony No. 5 (1946)
Symphony No. 6 Fantaisies symphoniques (1953)
Concerto for Oboe and Small Orchestra (1955)
Modest Mussorgsky
Boris Godunov (1874)
Carl Orff
Carmina Burana (1935–36)
Sergei Prokofiev
Scythian Suite (1914–15)
Chout (1915–21)
Symphony No. 2 (1924–25)
Symphony No. 4 (1929–30)
Lieutenant Kijé (1934)
Overture on Hebrew Themes (arr. orch 1934)
The Queen of Spades (1936)
Russian Overture (1936)
Cantata for the 20th Anniversary of the October Revolution (1936–37)
Alexander Nevsky (1938)
Romeo and Juliet (1938)
Cinderella (1940–44)
Ivan the Terrible (1942–45)
Symphony No. 5 (1944)
Flourish, Mighty Land (1947)
Symphony No. 6 (1947)
The Tale of the Stone Flower (1948–53)
Symphony No. 7 (1952)
Sergei Rachmaninoff
Symphonic Dances (1940)
Ottorino Respighi
Fountains of Rome (1916)
Pines of Rome (1924)
Roman Festivals (1928)
Camille Saint-Saëns
Symphony No. 3 (1886)
Dmitri Shostakovich
Symphony No. 1 (1924–25)
Symphony No. 5 (1937)
Symphony No. 7 (1941)
Symphony No. 13 (1962)
Karlheinz Stockhausen
Gruppen for three orchestras (1955–57)
Inori (1973–74)
Igor Stravinsky
The Firebird (1910)
Petrushka (1911)
Les Noces (1914–17)
Oedipus rex (1927)
Symphony of Psalms (scored for two pianos) (1930)
Symphony in Three Movements (1942–45)
Scherzo à la russe (1944)
Ebony Concerto (1945)
Agon (1957)
Threni (1958)
The Flood (1963)
Variations: Aldous Huxley in memoriam (1964)
Requiem Canticles (1966)

See also 
 List of compositions for keyboard and orchestra
 List of harpsichord concertos
 List of Triple Concertos for Violin, Cello, Piano and Orchestra
 List of works for piano left-hand and orchestra

References

External links 
 A very complete list of works for piano and orchestra (more than 300 pages)

Piano and orchestra